The 1st South Carolina Volunteer Infantry Regiment (Colored) was a Union Army regiment during the American Civil War, formed by General Rufus Saxton.  It was composed of escaped slaves from South Carolina and Florida.  It was one of the first black regiments in the Union Army.

History
Department of the South staff officer James D. Fessenden was heavily involved in efforts to recruit volunteers for the 1st South Carolina. Although it saw some combat, the regiment was not involved in any of the war's major battles. As would be true of all future regiments composed of black men, the officers of the 1st South Carolina were white. A proclamation by Confederate President Jefferson Davis had ordered that members of the regiment would not be treated as prisoners of war if taken in battle:  The enlisted men were to be delivered to state authorities to be auctioned off or otherwise treated as runaway slaves, while the white officers were to be hanged.

The regiment was particularly effective at conducting raids along the coast of Florida and Georgia, due to the men’s familiarity with the terrain.

The regiment was a step in the evolution of Union thinking towards the escaped slaves who crossed their lines.  Initially they were returned to their owners.  Next they were considered contraband and employed as laborers. Finally the legal fiction that they were property was abandoned and they were allowed to enlist in the Army, although in segregated units commanded by white officers. Harriet Tubman served with these men as a cook, nurse, spy, and scout. Susie King Taylor, whose husband and other relatives fought with the regiment, also served as a laundress and nurse for the men from August 1862 until mustering out on February 9, 1866.  As a holdover from the "contraband" days, black privates were paid $10 per month, the rate for laborers, rather than the $13 paid to white privates. The men served as the precedent for the over 170,000 "colored" troops who followed them into the Union Army.

Officers
The regiment’s first commander was Col. Thomas Wentworth Higginson, a minister, author and abolitionist. He wrote of his men, “We, their officers, did not go there to teach lessons, but to receive them. There were more than a hundred men in the ranks who had voluntarily met more dangers in their escape from slavery than any of my young captains had incurred in all their lives.” 

During the war Higginson documented the Gullah dialect spoken by some of the men and made a record of the spirituals that they sang. Higginson later wrote a book about his experiences titled Army Life in a Black Regiment.

Captain Seth Rogers was regimental surgeon and wrote extensive wartime letters. His nephew, Captain James Seth Rogers, previously of the 51st Massachusetts, was captain of Company B.

Redesignation
The regiment was re-designated the 33rd United States Colored Infantry Regiment on February 8, 1864.

See also
1st Kansas Colored Infantry Regiment
1st Louisiana Native Guard (United States)
Liberty Billings, second in command of the regiment
List of Union South Carolina Civil War Units

Note

References

Other sources
 Stephen V. Ash, Firebrand of Liberty: The Story of Two Black Regiments That Changed the Course of the Civil War (W. W. Norton & Company 2008).
 Higginson, Thomas Wentworth, Army Life in a Black Regiment, 1869.

Infantry, 001
South Carolina Infantry, 001
1863 establishments in South Carolina
Military units and formations disestablished in 1864